Metal Mech: Man & Machine (known in Japan as ) is a 1990 video game for the Nintendo Entertainment System.

Summary

The player controls the driver of a vehicle that is similar to the ED-209 of the RoboCop franchise.

The player must clear levels filled with randomly generated enemies in an unnamed city in order to survive. Items that can upgrade the firepower and defense of the vehicle are hidden in crates. Players must spend as much time outside of the armored unit as they do inside because the mech is a bigger (but tougher) target. They must also leave the mech to climb ladders that lead to needed items and to advance the game's storyline. However, veteran gamers of this genre have noted more than a few similarities to Blaster Master. The "little person" has a virtually identical appearance to Jason in the Blaster Master video game. Controlling the person is easier than controlling the mech. Players have to collect radiation symbols around the city, which was also the main point of Blaster Master.

External links

1990 video games
Jaleco games
Nintendo Entertainment System games
Nintendo Entertainment System-only games
Platform games
Science fiction video games
Side-scrolling video games
Video games developed in the United States